Joseph Edward Jett, known as Joe Jett (born c. 1960) is an American politician from the state of Arkansas. A member of the Republican Party since December 2016, Jett represents District 56 in the Arkansas House of Representatives. Jett switched parties shortly after winning reelection in 2016 as a Democrat.

In 2013, Jett was selected by the University of Virginia, Business School of Darden, as one of the top 50 up and coming legislators in the United States.

In 2019, Jett was re-elected to a fourth term in the Arkansas House of Representatives for District 56.

Jett is from rural Success in Clay County in the northeastern corner of his state. Before he was elected to the Arkansas House, Mike Beebe, the Democratic governor of Arkansas, appointed Jett to the Arkansas Department of Aeronautics Commission in 2007.

References

External links
 

Living people
People from Clay County, Arkansas
Arkansas Democrats
Members of the Arkansas House of Representatives
Arkansas Republicans
21st-century American politicians
Year of birth missing (living people)